Beridella is a genus of flies in the family Stratiomyidae.

Species
Beridella brunnicosa Becker, 1919
Beridella guerinii (Macquart, 1846)
Beridella iris (James, 1975)
Beridella maculifrons (Enderlein, 1921)

References

Stratiomyidae
Brachycera genera
Taxa named by Theodor Becker
Diptera of South America